Celestina Aladekoba is a recording artist, dancer and actress. She is perhaps best known for appearing in Prince's "Black Sweat" music video, and in MTV's original dance-themed reality show program DanceLife.

Life and career
Aladekoba grew up in Nigeria and Maryland.

She is also well known for playing basketball and for winning the Miss California Jr. She was a background dancer in Missy Elliott, Will Smith and Usher music videos. The DanceLife cast appeared on The Ellen DeGeneres Show.

Aladekoba's fancy footwork has garnered her comparisons to prominent choreographers such as Fatima Robinson, Debbie Allen and Judith Jamison.

Her signature dance move is the "Matrix Move". The "Matrix Move" is done by firmly planting one's feet on the ground and leaning the body backward. Celestina has demonstrated the move on DanceLife. She has the ability to lean and balance with her body almost parallel to the ground, and throw her arms behind her.

Aladekoba has appeared on TV shows including That's So Raven, The Game and 90210.

In 2014, she was a dancer in Jason Derulo's music video for "Talk Dirty"

References

American female dancers
Dancers from Maryland
Living people
American people of Nigerian descent
American people of Yoruba descent
Participants in American reality television series
Year of birth missing (living people)
21st-century American women